The Golden Amur are a defunct professional ice hockey team from Khabarovsk, Russia. Golden Amur played one season as a member of Asia League Ice Hockey during the 2004-05 season. The Amur, a gold mining company which owned the team, suspended operations due to financial difficulties. The team played at the Platinum Arena, constructed in 2003 with 7,100 seats. The Amur finished third place of eight teams during the regular season, and were eliminated in the first round of the playoffs, losing three games to none to Kokudo.

External links
 Asia League team profile
 2004-2005 Asia League ice hockey archives

Asia League Ice Hockey teams
Defunct ice hockey teams in Russia
Sport in Khabarovsk